is a Japanese actor who is represented by the talent agency, Sun Music Production.

Mori graduated from Komazawa University High School and Nippon Sport Science University. His wife is voice actress Tomoko Kaneda.

Filmography

Films

References

External links
Official profile 
 

Japanese male actors
1983 births
Living people
People from Kanagawa Prefecture